Martí Crespí Pascual (born 15 June 1987) is a Spanish professional footballer who plays for Atlético Sanluqueño CF as a central defender.

Club career
Born in Sa Pobla, Majorca, Balearic Islands, Crespí finished his development at local RCD Mallorca. He made his senior debut whilst on loan, successively representing Segunda División clubs Granada 74 CF, Xerez CD and Elche CF; he scored his first goal as a professional on 9 March 2008 while at the service of Granada, in a 2–1 away loss against CD Castellón.

After returning to the Estadi de Son Moix, Crespí's maiden appearance in La Liga took place on 3 October 2010 when he played the entire 1–1 away draw with FC Barcelona. During his two-year spell, he appeared in only 21 matches in all competitions.

Crespí moved to the Ukrainian Premier League on 12 July 2012, after signing with FC Chornomorets Odessa. In the following transfer window, he returned to his country and joined second-tier team Racing de Santander.

In the summer of 2013, after being relegated, Crespí signed a one-year contract at fellow league side CE Sabadell FC. He scored his first goal for them on 21 December of that year, helping to a 3–0 away victory over CD Tenerife.

After suffering another relegation, Crespí took his game to the China League One, starting out at Qingdao Huanghai FC.  After a stint with Nei Mongol Zhongyou F.C. in the same tier, he joined Indian Super League club Delhi Dynamos FC on 23 August 2018.

International career
Crespí won two caps for Spain at youth level. His only for the under-20s came on 21 March 2007, in a 3–1 friendly win against the Czech Republic.

Career statistics

Honours
Xerez
Segunda División: 2008–09

References

External links

1987 births
Living people
People from Sa Pobla
Spanish footballers
Footballers from Mallorca
Association football defenders
La Liga players
Segunda División players
Segunda División B players
Primera Federación players
Segunda Federación players
RCD Mallorca B players
RCD Mallorca players
Granada 74 CF footballers
Xerez CD footballers
Elche CF players
Racing de Santander players
CE Sabadell FC footballers
Barakaldo CF footballers
San Fernando CD players
Atlético Sanluqueño CF players
FC Chornomorets Odesa players
China League One players
Qingdao F.C. players
Inner Mongolia Zhongyou F.C. players
Indian Super League players
I-League players
Odisha FC players
East Bengal Club players
Spain youth international footballers
Spanish expatriate footballers
Expatriate footballers in Ukraine
Expatriate footballers in China
Expatriate footballers in India
Spanish expatriate sportspeople in Ukraine
Spanish expatriate sportspeople in China
Spanish expatriate sportspeople in India